Negangards Corner is an unincorporated community in Franklin Township, Ripley County, in the U.S. state of Indiana.

History
Negangards Corner had its start when a general store opened at the town site. An old variant name of the community was called North Hogan.

A post office opened under the name North Hogan in 1844, and remained in operation until it was discontinued in 1877.

Geography

References

Unincorporated communities in Ripley County, Indiana
Unincorporated communities in Indiana